Yaroslavka is a rural locality (a selo) in Nizhneilyinovsky Selsoviet of Mikhaylovsky District, Amur Oblast, Russia. The population was 68 as of 2018. There are 2 streets.

Geography 
Yaroslavka is located on the right bank of the Dim River, 48 km north of Poyarkovo (the district's administrative centre) by road. Nizhnyaya Ilyinovka is the nearest rural locality.

References 

Rural localities in Mikhaylovsky District, Amur Oblast